Ciampino railway station serves the town and comune of Ciampino, in the region of Lazio, central Italy.  It forms part of the Rome–Cassino–Naples railway, and is also a junction for three other lines, to Velletri, Albano, and Frascati, respectively.

Overview 
The railway station is currently managed by Rete Ferroviaria Italiana (RFI).  Train services are operated by Trenitalia.  Each of these companies is a subsidiary of Ferrovie dello Stato (FS), Italy's state-owned rail company.

As one of the most important stations in Rome, and the most important in the southern quadrant of Lazio, the station enables interchange between two Ferrovie regionali del Lazio commuter lines, and also serves Rome-Ciampino Airport.

Location 
Ciampino railway station is situated at Piazza Luigi Rizzo, very close to the centre of the town.

Passenger and train movements 
The station is part of two Ferrovie regionali del Lazio commuter lines:

Line FR4 has its central terminus at Roma Termini.  When it reaches Ciampino, it forks into three branches, to Velletri, Albano Laziale and Frascati, respectively.
Line FR6 links Roma Termini with Frosinone and Cassino on the Rome–Cassino–Naples railway.

Interchange 
The station has a bus terminal, with urban buses, and suburban buses to Ciampino Airport and Anagnina metro station.

See also 

History of rail transport in Italy
List of railway stations in Lazio
Rail transport in Italy
Railway stations in Italy

Sources

Bibliography 
 Blasimme, op. cit., p. 22/23
 Service Order no. 151 of the 1939
 Paolo Blasimme, La ferrovia Velletri–Segni, in "I Treni", anno XVI n. 157 (febbraio 1995), pp. 22–26.

External links 
 

Railway stations in Lazio
Buildings and structures in the Metropolitan City of Rome Capital